Brand is a borough of Aachen, Germany, with about 18,000 residents. The borough lies in the south-east part of Aachen and borders Kornelimünster/Walheim, Forst, Oberforstbach und Eilendorf, as well as the town of Stolberg.

Brand was a self-administered community in the district of Aachen until 1972, when administrative reforms of the communities in the area caused Brand to be absorbed into Aachen. The current borough of Brand is made up of the towns Brand, Freund, Krauthausen, Niederforstbach, Brander Feld and Rollef.

At 270.9 meters, the highest point of the borough is a noise barrier along the Bundesautobahn 44, which runs through Brand Forest.

Town symbols and the coat of arms 

The Coat of Arms of Brand is divided horizontally and shows in its upper section the horn of Pope Cornelius, a symbol of the areas previous affiliation to the Kornelimünster Abbey. In the lower part is a burning set of three hills (a somewhat common heraldic device). This symbolizes the three quarters of Brand, which are Freund, Brand and Niederforstbach, and which each lie on a small hill. The fire stands for the borough's name Brand, which means “fire”. The reason that the area is called this, however, is etymologically unclear.

Symbols for the borough include the Brand Bull, which is commemorated by a bronze statue at the center of Brand. It likely stems from the town's association with the horn of Pope Cornelius on the coat of arms, and is meant to symbolize residents’ obstinacy.

History 

While the area of Brand was probably inhabited by Celtic people between the 2nd and 1st century b.C. (as suggested by the toponym Rollef), the first actual mention of the Brand settlement is from 1369. A chapel dedicated to St.Donatus has been built in 1761. With the Napoleonic occupation, in 1802 Brand gained independence from the abbey of Kornelimünster, becoming an autonomous community until absorbed into Aachen in 1972. Trierer Straße, today still the main artery of the borough, was built in the same period. In the 1890s the current St.Donatus church was built.

Brand Heath 
The English Count de Rice, whose personal details remain unknown, bought from the Kornelimünster Abbey more than three hundred acres of the treeless Brand Heath (which is today the area around North Street (Nordstrasse) and Erberichshof Street, bounded by Eilendorf Street (Eilendorferstr.), and at the time included the estates of Gut Neuenhof, the Krummerrück, and the Hebscheider Hof), so that he could build homes and a horse racetrack. In 1789 the Count went bankrupt and the area was repossessed, but later it was given to the community of Brand, which still built the racetrack, along with a grandstand.

In the 19th century, horse racing in Brand enjoyed great popularity after it had been initiated in 1830 by the industrialist James Cockerill and further expanded upon in 1870 by his grandchildren and respected gentlemen riders Otto and Henry Suermondt, who would later serve as the nucleus of the Aachen-Laurensberg Riding Club.

After the turn of the 20th century, equestrian sports in the area became more concentrated in Soers, and so the wide-open area of Brand became a staging area for Aachen area flight pioneer and airplane builder Erich Lochner. It is also here that the first flight demonstrations of a propeller driven airplane took place. Later, the Aachen Association of Aeronautics (founded in 1911 and made up of private individuals, scientists from RWTH Aachen University, and military officers) rented the area and built maintenance and assembly workshops. Until 1913, numerous flights took place here under international cooperation, but despite these initial successes, the activities of the airfield had to be stopped because the club had incurred too much debt and could no longer operate.

Infrastructure 
Brand features a section of the Bundesautobahn 44, the Lützow barracks of the Armed Forces, a comprehensive school (City Comprehensive School Aachen-Brand) and three elementary schools (GGS Brand Field, Karl Kuck School, and Market School). The Catholic parish of Saint Donatus features two churches. There is also the Protestant Martin Luther Church and an LDS church. In addition, Brand has had its own public library since 1857 and a city theatre since 1998.

In addition to its own police station, there is also a voluntary fire department for the city of Aachen. A local chapter of the Technischen Hilfswerkes is also present in the district.

Brand train station 

In earlier times, the train station in Brand was a stop on the Vennbahn railway line. It opened 1 December 1885 as the Brand Station and was renamed Brand (Rheinland) in the 1950s. It was located between Trierer Straße and Eckenerstraße, which was spanned by a level crossing. On 29 May 1960 commuter traffic was discontinued at the station, and 1 April 1980 saw the end of freight traffic as well. The tracks between Brand and Kornelimünster were torn up in 1982, while the tracks to Aachen-Rothe Erde were removed in 1985.

The earlier tracks between Rothe Erde and Walheim are today used as a bike and pedestrian path and is known as the Vennbahn path (Vennbahnweg). The station building was eventually remodeled and is now used as a restaurant.

References

Books cited 
 Kratz, Christian: St. Donatus in Aachen-Brand. Einhard-Verlag, Aachen 2000.
 Jeuckens, Robert: Geschichte von Gemeinde und Pfarre Brand. Veröffentlichungen des Bischöflichen Diözesanarchivs Aachen, Bd. 21, Aachen 1954
 Heimatblätter des Landkreises Aachen. Jg. 6, Nr. 3, Juli 1936
 Brand. Ein Ort verändert sich. Hrsg. vom Bürgerverein Brand e. V., Aachen 1985
 Brand Heimatkundliche Blätter 1, 1990 ff.

External links 

 Offizielle Seite der Stadt Aachen zum Ortsteil Brand
 [kln/KBRD.htm Beschreibung des Bahnhofs Brand (Rheinland)] im NRWbahnArchiv von André Joost
 Homepage der Bücherinsel St. Donatus Brand

Aachen